Fritz Grieshammer (30 March 1899 – 26 December 1956) was a highly decorated Generalmajor in the Luftwaffe during World War II. He was also a recipient of the Knight's Cross of the Iron Cross. The Knight's Cross of the Iron Cross was awarded to recognise extreme battlefield bravery or successful military leadership. Fritz Grieshammer was captured by American troops in May 1945 and was held until June 1947.

Awards and decorations
 Iron Cross (1914)
 2nd Class
 1st Class
 Honour Cross of the World War 1914/1918 (20 December 1934)
 Iron Cross (1939)
 2nd Class (19 January 1940)
 1st Class (16 December 1940)
 Anti-Aircraft Flak Battle Badge (16 December 1941)
 Knight's Cross of the Iron Cross on 12 April 1945 as Generalmajor and commander of 24. Flak-Division

References

Citations

Bibliography

External links 
TracesOfWar.com

1899 births
1956 deaths
People from Rehau
Luftwaffe World War II generals
German Army personnel of World War I
Military personnel from Bavaria
Recipients of the clasp to the Iron Cross, 1st class
Recipients of the Knight's Cross of the Iron Cross
German prisoners of war in World War II held by the United States
People from the Kingdom of Bavaria
Major generals of the Luftwaffe